Canada was the host country of the 2010 Winter Paralympics, in Vancouver, the first time it had hosted the Winter Paralympics.

The 2010 Winter Paralympics was the most successful Winter Paralympics for Canada, through 2010. It collected the most total medals and most gold medals of any Winter Paralympics up until then. Canada ended the Games with 19 total medals, 10 of them gold, ending at 3rd in total medals ranking, and 3rd in gold medal ranking. This met the performance level set by the Canadian Paralympic Committee, of ending third in total medal count.

Canadian cross-country skier Brian McKeever, who would have competed at the 2010 Winter Olympics, would have been the first athlete ever to compete both at both the Winter Olympics and the Winter Paralympics. However, his coach cut him two days before the competition so McKeever will in fact not set an Olympic record. McKeever will compete in cross-country and biathlon events at the Winter Paralympics, with his brother Robin as his guide.

Viviane Forest became the first para-athlete to win a gold in both the Winter and Summer Games, by winning the Women's Downhill for Visually Impaired. She had previously won gold in the 2000 and 2004 Summer Paralympics for women's goalball.

Lauren Woolstencroft became the first Canadian to win 3 golds at the same Winter Paralympics, this was eventually upped to 5 golds. With her 4th gold medal, she helped Canada set a record for most gold medals at any Winter Paralympic Games by winning the 7th medal. The previous mark was six, set at the 2002 Salt Lake City Paralympics. With her 5th gold medal, she set the record for most gold medals won by any Winter Paralympian at a single Games, and she tied the record for gold medal haul of any Canadian Paralympian at a single Games, tying Chantal Petitclerc (who did the feat twice) and Stephanie Dixon, both Summer Paralympians. Her five gold are also the record for any Canadian Winter Paralympian or Olympian.

Medalists

Alpine skiing

Women

Men

Biathlon

Women

Men

Cross-country skiing

Women

Men

Ice sledge hockey

The Canadian sledge hockey team qualified for the 2010 Paralympics by winning the bronze medal at the 2009 IPC Ice Sledge Hockey World Championships.

Roster

Preliminary round

Round robin

Standings

Playoff round

Semifinal

Bronze medal game

Wheelchair curling

Roster

Preliminary round

Round robin

Standings

Playoffs

Semifinal

Gold medal game

See also
Canada at the 2010 Winter Olympics
Canada at the Paralympics

References

External links
Vancouver 2010 Paralympic Games official website
Canadian Paralympic Committee official website
International Paralympic Committee official website

Nations at the 2010 Winter Paralympics
2010
Paralympics